Pachyballus miniscutulus is a species of jumping spider in the genus Pachyballus that lives in South Africa. The female was first described in 2020.

References

Salticidae
Spiders described in 2020
Spiders of South Africa
Taxa named by Wanda Wesołowska